Darius Maciulevičius (born 6 November 1973) is a Lithuanian football coach and a former player. He is the manager of Ekranas.

Career 
He has also represented clubs such as Alania Vladikavkaz, Hakoah Ramat Gan and FK Sūduva Marijampolė.

International career 
Maciulevičius played 37 caps, scoring 8 goals, for the Lithuanian National Team.

International goals and appearances

Honours
National Team
 Baltic Cup
 2005

External links 

omnitel

1973 births
Living people
Lithuanian footballers
Association football midfielders
FK Žalgiris players
FK Inkaras Kaunas players
FC Spartak Vladikavkaz players
FK Kareda Kaunas players
Hakoah Maccabi Amidar Ramat Gan F.C. players
FC Vilnius players
FBK Kaunas footballers
FC Mordovia Saransk players
FK Sūduva Marijampolė players
Atlantis FC players
A Lyga players
Russian Premier League players
Liga Leumit players
Lithuania international footballers
Lithuanian expatriate footballers
Expatriate footballers in Russia
Expatriate footballers in Israel
Lithuanian expatriate sportspeople in Russia
Lithuanian expatriate sportspeople in Israel
Lithuanian football managers
FK Ekranas managers